Grevillea wilsonii, also known as Wilson's grevillea or native fuchsia is a shrub that is endemic to south western parts of Western Australia.

Description
The shrub endemic to the southwest of Western Australia.

Taxonomy
The species was first formally described by botanist Allan Cunningham, his description published in Thomas Braidwood Wilson's Narrative of a Voyage Round the World in 1835. The specific epithet honours Wilson.

Distribution
The shrub is found along the Swan Coastal Plain from arounf Toodyay in the north, out to Brookton in the east and as far south as Bunbury. It is found growing in sandy or sandy-loamy or sometimes in lateritic gravel usually as a apart of shrubland communities.

Cultivation
This species requires a well-drained soil and full sun or partial shade. Propagation is from cuttings; grafting on the east coast of Australia may ensure greater reliability.

References

External links

wilsonii
Eudicots of Western Australia
Proteales of Australia
Garden plants
Taxa named by Allan Cunningham (botanist)
Plants described in 1835